Richard Obermoser is an Austrian male curler.

Teams

References

External links

Living people
Austrian male curlers

Year of birth missing (living people)
Place of birth missing (living people)